Our Lady of the Miraculous Medal Church, known in Spanish as Iglesia de la Medalla de la Virgen Milagrosa or simply Iglesia de la Medalla Milagrosa is a church in Colonia Narvarte, Mexico City, Mexico. The church was designed by Spanish-Mexican architect, Félix Candela and constructed between 1953 and 1955.

The monks who had commissioned the project favored a Gothic building and reportedly did not realize the design's modern style until after construction had started.

References 

Félix Candela buildings
Churches in Mexico City
Churches completed in 1955